The Ultimate Gift is a 2006 American drama film directed by Michael O. Sajbel from a screenplay written by Cheryl McKay, which is based on the best selling novel by Jim Stovall, who cameos in the film. It stars Drew Fuller, Ali Hillis, Bill Cobbs, Abigail Breslin, Brian Dennehy, and James Garner in his final live action film appearance. It was released on March 9, 2007 in the United States and Canada.

The film's DVD sales were quite high in relation to its theatrical receipts and it continues to be a success in DVD sales and on television. Two sequels, The Ultimate Life and The Ultimate Legacy, were released in 2013 and 2015 respectively.

Plot 
When his rich grandfather, Howard "Red" Stevens, dies, Jason does not expect to inherit anything from his multi-billion-dollar estate. He strongly resents his grandfather because his father had died while working for him. There is an inheritance, in fact, but it comes with a condition: Jason must complete 12 separate assignments within a year in order to get it. Each assignment is centered around a "gift". Gifts of work, money, friends and learning are among the dozen that Jason must perform before he is eligible for the mysterious "Ultimate Gift" his grandfather's will has for him. Red's attorney and friend, Mr. Hamilton, and his secretary, Miss Hastings, attempt to guide Jason along the path his grandfather wishes him to travel.

He first goes to Texas where he works on his grandfather's friend Gus Caldwell's ranch for a month, learning what hard work is. On his return after completing the first task, everything he values is suddenly taken away from him – his luxury apartment, his restored muscle car, and all his money – and he is left homeless. His trendy girlfriend, Caitlin, ditches him when his credit card is rejected at a fancy restaurant, and none of his friends are willing to give him a place to stay despite him having done so many favors for them in the past. After his mother tells him she cannot help him, as part of the agreement, he miserably wanders the city alone. While sleeping in a park, he encounters a woman, Alexia, and her outspoken daughter, Emily. Jason befriends the two, and then asks them to go to the attorney's office and confirm themselves as his "true friends" in order to pass his assignment, but afterwards Jason walks away and ignores Emily's request to see him again. However, Jason accidentally discovers that Emily is suffering from leukemia, and sees a chance to develop a strong bond with someone.

From that point, he tries his best to help Emily have a great life while it lasts, and Emily encourages a romance between Jason and her mother. Another of his tasks requires him to travel to Ecuador and study in a library his father and grandfather built to help the people there. This brings him to address his resentment over the death of his father there, and he makes a trip into the mountains with a local guide to see where it happened. Jason learns from his guide that the story he had always believed about his father's death was a lie, fabricated by his grandfather out of guilt and shame for trying to push Jason's father into the oil business. Jason and the guide are captured there and taken hostage by militants for several weeks, until Jason manages to ensure their escape. He returns to America and discovers that Emily's condition has deteriorated, so he arranges for Gus to host a belated Christmas celebration at his home for them.

Upon completing his twelve tasks, Jason is given a sum of $100-million to do with whatever he pleases, and all of his property is returned to him. Caitlin, knowing that he has regained his wealth, makes an attempt to win him back, but Jason declines her offer. With his inheritance, Jason chooses to build a hospital, called Emily's Home, for children with terminal illnesses, but before the building begins, Emily dies. After the groundbreaking for Emily's Home, Jason is recalled to the law firm for one more meeting and told he has exceeded the expectations of his dead grandfather, and he is given the final gift of $2-billion dollars, rewarding Jason not only for his completing the tasks, but for using the $100-million to help others. That night, Jason is seen sitting on a bench in the park, when Alexia joins him. He thanks her for the help that she and her daughter gave him. Then they kiss, as a butterfly, representing Emily, flies around them.

Cast 

In addition, then Mayor of Charlotte, North Carolina Pat McCrory has a cameo appearance as himself, while Jim Stovall, the author of the book the film is based on, has a cameo as the limo driver near the end of the film.

Production 
The film was financed with $14 million from the Stanford Financial Group, a Houston based firm the U.S. Securities and Exchange Commission shut down two years later for being a "massive Ponzi scheme".

Reception

Critical response 
On review aggregator Rotten Tomatoes, The Ultimate Gift holds an approval rating of 33% based on 60 reviews, with an average rating of 5.20/10. The website's critical consensus reads, "Though The Ultimate Gift avoids religious speechifying like other Fox Faith films, it's dramatically inert with flat direction." On Metacritic, the film has a weighted average score of 49 out of 100, based on 16 critics, indicating "mixed or average reviews".

The New York Times reviewer said, "Reeking of self-righteousness and moral reprimand, [the movie] is a hairball of good-for-you filmmaking..... [T]he movie's messages are methodically hammered home." Christianity Today felt the film warranted 3.5 out of 4 stars and called it "lovingly crafted ... but never manages to build up much mystery, suspense, tension, or narrative steam." Joe Leydon of Variety magazine was favorably impressed and noted that "discussions of faith and God are fleeting, almost subliminal — without stinting on the celebration of wholesome family values." William Arnold of the Seattle Post-Intelligencer wrote: "Its sincerity, optimism and air of open-minded tolerance go down well, and it makes a nice change-of-pace." He lauded its "tight and often compelling" screenplay, sparkling dialogue and "first-rate" production values.

Box office and home media 
The Ultimate Gift opened with receipts of $1.2 million on its first weekend, with final box office of $3.4 million.

DVD sales were $9.55 million in the first two months following its release.

Soundtrack 
Mark McKenzie wrote the film's incidental music. At the film's climax, "Something Changed" is highlighted, a song composed by Contemporary Christian Music-singer Sara Groves. Other songs include "Gotta Serve Somebody" by Bob Dylan, "The Thrill is Gone" by B.B. King, and "Crazy" by Patsy Cline.

See also
 Tuesdays with Morrie

References

External links 

 
 
 
 
 

2000s English-language films
2006 films
Films about inheritances
Films shot in North Carolina
Films based on American novels
Films about Christianity